Ohud Hospital is a 280-bed hospital in the outskirts of Madinah Al Munawwara, Saudi Arabia. It is located adjacent to the large air conditioning and electricity complex that supplies Masjid Al-Nabawi. The hospital also contains a residential campus where the hospital doctors reside. Nurses quarters are also located on site.

It started its life in 1405 as a charity hospital called Badr Al-Khairi and because it was well constructed and neat, it was taken over by the ministry of health. An identical campus is also located on the outskirts of Madinah.

References

, and 

Saudi Arabia
Hospitals established in the 15th century